Banie Mazurskie  is a village in Gołdap County, Warmian-Masurian Voivodeship, in northern Poland, close to the border with the Kaliningrad Oblast of Russia. It is the seat of the gmina (administrative district) called Gmina Banie Mazurskie.

The village has a population of 1,500.

References

Banie Mazurskie